Hudhud ni Aliguyon is a famous epic that came from the Ifugao province of Luzon in the Philippines. It narrates events about the culture and traditions of the Ifugao people and their hero, Aliguyon. Belonging in the genre of Hudhud di Ani for harvesting in the fields, this heroic epic has three functions.

Origin 
When the alim and the hudhud started to be chanted is unknown. The Ifugao state that both have been chanted since time immemorial, with no words to specify whether this is in the hundreds or thousands of years. A study by a scholar of the hudhud indicates that this might have pre-dated the construction of the rice terraces. The earliest dated terraces are found in Bunghalian municipality with a Carbon-14 determination of 610 AD., although the earliest human occupation of the municipality of Banaue is between 1545–825 BC. Both forms are virtual anthropological documents that orally record through time the changes that took place in Ifugao social organization, structure, and tradition. The infusion of modern elements in the text indicates the relative time of change. For instance, the mention of a gun in one of the stories suggests an influence that could only have come from the West, although the fact that the gun caused the conflagration of an entire village to indicate the idea of a gun was still a bit confused and was therefore still something novel.

Use 
In general, the Hudhud of the Ifugao is chanted only on four occasions—harvesting of rice, weeding of rice, funeral wakes, and bone-washing rituals. Hudhud ni Aliguyon is specifically included in the genre called Hudhud di Page or Hudhud di Ani, meaning Hudhud for Harvest in the Fields.

The chant is usually sung by a female group. It is led by a soloist, an expert singer who may have volunteered to lead, followed by a chorus of about ten to twelve women. The chorus need not memorize the whole chant. The lead singer (the munhaw-e) simply declares the title, and the group (mun-hudhud/mun-abbuy) joins the chanting as the cue words used to include names of characters, villages, topography, and kinship relationships.

Form 
The Hudhud comprises more than 200 chants, with each divided into 40 episodes. A complete recitation may last three to four days. The language of the stories abounds in figurative expressions and repetitions and employs metonymy, metaphor and onomatopoeia.

Plot Summary 
In a village called Hannanga, a boy named Aliguyon was born. He was the son of the village's leader, Amtalao, and his wife Dumulao. He was an intelligent young man who was always eager to learn and listen to the stories and teachings of his father. Indeed, he learned many useful things. He knew how to do proper combat, and even how to chant a few magic spells.

Aliguyon showed promise and great leadership at an early age, which earned the awe and amazement of his fellow villagers, even children. During his teenage years, he decided to go into battle with his father's enemy, Pangaiwan of the village of Daligdigan. However, his challenge was not personally answered by Pangaiwan. Instead, he went face-to-face with Pangaiwan's fierce son, Pumbakhayon. Pumbakhayon was just as skilled in the arts of war and magic as Aliguyon.

Upon battle, without hesitation, Aliguyon hurled a spear towards Pumbakhayon. Without blinking an eye, Pumbakhayon moved to avoid the spear, caught it, and then quickly tossed it back towards Aliguyon's way. In retaliation, Aliguyon did the same. The two of them continued this battle for a long time,  with Aliguyon and Pumbakhayon just alternately throwing one spear towards each other in the hopes of ending the life of the other.

In the three years of their non-stop fight, neither of them showed signs of weariness and defeat, causing Aliguyon and Pumbakhayon to develop respect and admiration for each other. With their realization came the end of their fight. Together, Aliguyon and Pumbakhayon developed and drafted a peace treaty between the towns of Hannanga and Daligdigan, which their people celebrated and readily agreed to.

As peace slowly settled, the two villages prospered. Aliguyon and Pumbakhayon forged a strong friendship. Aliguyon ended up marrying Bugan, Pumbakhayon younger sister, while Pumbakhayon married Aliguyon's sister, Aginaya.

Characters

Notable Themes

Double Marriage 
Hudhud ni Aliguyon, like some hudhuds, would tackle the romantic adventures of the characters. It would show that ordeals are resolved after a long fight between the two men, who are unable to defeat each other. After gaining each other's respect, the story ends with the marriage of the hero to the former enemy's sister, and the hero's sister to be wed to this former enemy. In the hudhuds, it was always so that there are only two children, a male and a female. The two men after the fight exchange sisters with a marriage alliance, such that a brother and sister marry the other sister and brother.

This epic focuses on peacemaking and a heroic tradition where no blood is spilt. The celebration of the double marriage is a representation of the elimination of enmity, meaning that the next generation will no longer have these enemies.

Family Solidarity 
Family solidarity is also a theme expressed in the hudhud. The hudhud would start with a conflict of the fathers which will eventually be carried on to the children. The children have to avenge and continue to fight any enemy or outsider who made offences against the family.

Respect for Parents and Elders and Prominence for Women 
Parents and elders were addressed properly, using terms such as Aman for father and Innan hi for mother. Also, the hero's mother specifically is given respect and prominence. It is evident in one part of the epic as the mother called to stop the fight between the two characters saying that Pumbakhayon must eat first.

Values of the Hudhud and Relevance 
Values are the ideas and beliefs that matter to people. They are deep-rooted motivations of behaviour and attitude. They define what is important and become the basis of choices, decisions, and reactions. The DECS Values Education Framework pronounced that “values help an individual realize himself as a person in the community responsible for his growth as well as for that of his fellow human being and the development of society.”

The Ifugao literature is rich in values as reflected in their songs, narratives, chants, and folktales. Using the DECS Revised Values Education Framework, a total of 896 values were found reflected in Hudhud ni Aliguyon, Hudhud ni Aliguyon and Bugan, and Hudhud ni Aliguyon and Dinoy-again. More specifically, there were 289 values reflected in Hudhud ni Aliguyon. These findings show that the Hudhud are rich in values reflective of the values of the Ifugaos.

There were 7 core values utilized in the study:

The results of the core values as shown in the table strongly signifies that the Ifugaos are socially responsible in all aspects. This social responsibility connotes mutual love and respect, fidelity, responsible parenthood, concern for others, social justice, freedom, and equality. Ifugaos also have high regard for living. The predominant theme of the Hudhud stories is exemplifying romances praising Ifugao ideals of love, marriage and wealth.

Awards and recognitions 
 International Arirang Prize by the Republic of Korea (2001)
 Masterpieces of the Oral and Intangible Heritage of Humanity by UNESCO (2001)
 Natural Cultural Treasure (2001) by the National Museum of the Philippines

References

Bibliography 

 Lambrecht, Francis. Hudhud. 2005. NCCA-IHC.
 Picache, Cecilia V., 2009. Country Report on the Intangible Cultural Heritage Safeguarding Activities in Asia and the Pacific 2009.
 Peralta, Jesus T., 2007. The Philippines: on Safeguarding Intangible Cultural Heritage.
 Status Report on the Intangible Cultural Heritage Safeguarding in the Philippines. 2011.
 Terminal Report on the Safeguarding and Transmission of the Hudhud Chants of the Ifugao.  2008.

 Culture of Ifugao
 Epic poems